Toy Box is the debut EP of The Clay People, released in 1991 by Maltese Records. It was pivotal in revealing the band's early industrial approach making them staples of the cold wave scene. The song "Nothing" was previously recorded at Arabellum Studios in February 1990 and released on the B-side of The Calling 7" single, which was produced by Art Snay.

Track listing

Personnel
Adapted from the Toy Box liner notes.

Clay People
 Alex Eller – keyboards, programming, production
 Daniel Neet – lead vocals, production
 Peter Porto – Bass, production
 Kevin Michael Scott – electric guitar, cover concept, production (3)

Production and design
 George Hagegeorge – production, engineering, mixing
 Mark Morgan – cover art, photography

Release history

References

External links 
 

1991 EPs
The Clay People albums